Venetie Airport  is a public use airport located in Venetie, in the Yukon-Koyukuk Census Area of the U.S. state of Alaska. It is privately owned by the Venetie Tribal Government.

As per Federal Aviation Administration records, the airport had 1,993 passenger boardings (enplanements) in calendar year 2008, 2,120 enplanements in 2009, and 2,523 in 2010. It is included in the National Plan of Integrated Airport Systems for 2011–2015, which categorized it as a general aviation airport based on enplanements in 2008/2009 (the commercial service category requires at least 2,500 per year).

Facilities and aircraft 
Venetie Airport has one runway designated 4/22 with a gravel surface measuring 4,000 by 75 feet (1,219 x 23 m).

For the 12-month period ending December 31, 2005, the airport had 1,900 aircraft operations, an average of 158 per month: 79% air taxi and 21% general aviation.

Airlines and destinations 

The following airlines offer scheduled passenger service at this airport:

Top destinations

References

External links 

 Topographic map from USGS The National Map
 FAA Alaska airport diagram (GIF)
 

Airports in the Arctic
Airports in the Yukon–Koyukuk Census Area, Alaska
Native American airports